France was represented by 68 athletes at the 2012 European Athletics Championships in Helsinki, Finland.

Medals

Results

Men

Track

*Athletes who run the heats but not the final.

Combined

Field

Women

Track

*Athletes who run the heats but not the final

Combined

Field

References

Nations at the 2012 European Athletics Championships
2012
European Athletics Championships